Silenced : China's Great Wall of Censorship is a political book by Oystein Alme and Morten Vågen, published by Amaryllis Media in 2006. The book is about human rights and censorship in China and Tibet.

According to information on the pages of the website of Reporters Without Borders, the international non-governmental organization that advocates freedom of the press, this "book takes the reader on a fascinating and disturbing trip behind China’s Great Wall of Censorship. It also tells the story of Voice of Tibet, the radio station China couldn’t silence."

See also
Censorship in China

References

Political books
Current affairs books
History of Tibet
2006 non-fiction books